Snehavin Kadhalarkal ( Sneha's lovers) is a 2014 Indian Tamil language film written and directed by Muthuramalincoln. The film features Advaitha who plays the leading role of Sneha, with the storyline revolving around the men who come into her life.

Cast

 Advaitha as Sneha
 Thilak as Chinnu
 Uday.
 Athif Jey.
 Rathna Kumar.

Production

The film was produced by Mr. Ka.Kalaikotudhaiyam and Mrs. Amala Kalaikotudhaiyam on behalf of 'Tamilan kalaikoodam'.

Development
The film was initially shot using a 7D digital camera, with a 5D camera also being added later.

Location
Filming took place in and around the areas of Chennai, Madurai, Kodaikanal and Coimbatore.

Music
The soundtrack was composed by R.Prabahar (Music Composer). and consists of five songs which were released on 19 February 2014 at Prasad Studios Lab Theatre, Chennai, by producer Mr. Keyar.

Release and reception
The film was released on 15 August 2014. 

Sify wrote that "On the whole, Snehavin Kadhalargal is not a movie you would remember after watching. Had the director at least got the melodramatic acting toned down, this movie would have been watchable".

References

External links
 
 IBNLive News
 Indiaglitz Gallery
 HelloTamilCinema Gallery

2014 films
Films shot in India
2010s Tamil-language films
Films shot in Madurai
Films shot in Chennai
Films shot in Kodaikanal
Films shot in Coimbatore
2014 directorial debut films